Following is a table of United States presidential elections in Iowa, ordered by year. Since its admission to statehood in 1846, Iowa has participated in every U.S. presidential election.

Winners of the state are in bold. The shading refers to the state winner, and not the national winner.

Elections from 1864 to present

Election of 1860

The election of 1860 was a complex realigning election in which the breakdown of the previous two-party alignment culminated in four parties each competing for influence in different parts of the country. The result of the election, with the victory of an ardent opponent of slavery, spurred the secession of eleven states and brought about the American Civil War.

Elections prior to 1860

See also
 Elections in Iowa

Notes

References